Naimabad (also Romanized as Na‘īmābād; also known as Qal‘eh Now-e Na‘īmābād) is a village in Fazl Rural District, in the Central District of Nishapur County, Razavi Khorasan Province, Iran. At the 2006 census, its population was 385, in 100 families.

References 

Populated places in Nishapur County